Vali Dadashi known as Hamed Dadashi (born 1981) is an Iranian politician and academic.

Dadashi was born in Astara, Gilan. He is a member of the tenth Islamic Consultative Assembly from the electorate of Astara. Dadashi won with 14,173 (28%) votes.

References

People from Astara, Iran
Deputies of Astara, Iran
Living people
1981 births
Members of the 10th Islamic Consultative Assembly
Shahid Beheshti University alumni
Iranian Shia clerics